The Canadian Council of Churches (French: Conseil canadien des Églises) is a broad and inclusive ecumenical body, now representing 26 member churches including Anglican; Eastern and Roman Catholic; Evangelical; Free Church; Eastern and Oriental Orthodox; and Historic Protestant traditions. Together these member churches represent 13,500 worshiping communities and comprise 85% of the Christians in Canada.

The Canadian Council of Churches was founded in 1944.

Members & Friends of the Council

Member Churches 
There are now 26 member churches in the Canadian Council of Churches:
 Anglican Church of Canada
 Apostolic Catholic Church (ACC) Canada
 Archdiocese of Canada of the Orthodox Church in America
 Armenian Holy Apostolic Church, Canadian Diocese
 Canadian Association for Baptist Freedoms (formerly called Atlantic Baptist Fellowship)
 British Methodist Episcopal Church (Associate Member)
 Canadian Baptists of Ontario and Quebec
 Canadian Baptists of Western Canada
 Canadian Conference of Catholic Bishops
 Canadian Yearly Meeting of the Religious Society of Friends
 Christian Church (Disciples of Christ) in Canada
 Christian Reformed Church in North America, Canada
 The Coptic Orthodox Church of Canada
 Ethiopian Orthodox Tewahedo Church of Canada
 Evangelical Lutheran Church in Canada
 Greek Orthodox Metropolis of Toronto
 Malankara Orthodox Syrian Church – Northeast American Diocese
 The Mar Thoma Syrian Church
 Mennonite Church Canada
 Polish National Catholic Church of Canada (Associate Member)
 Presbyterian Church in Canada
 Regional Synod of Canada - Reformed Church in America
 The Salvation Army
 Ukrainian Catholic Church
 Ukrainian Orthodox Church of Canada
 United Church of Canada

Affiliates 
 Citizens for Public Justice
 Canadian Baptist Ministries
 The Canadian Bible Society
 The Gideons International in Canada
 Prairie Centre for Ecumenism
 A Rocha Canada
 Women's Inter-Church Council of Canada
 The Yonge Street Mission

Location, Governance, and Structure

Location and Staff 
The Council, with headquarters in Toronto, is governed and supported by its members through a semi-annual Governing Board. The current General Secretary of the council is Pastor Peter Noteboom. Officers and staff of the council are drawn from the diversity of traditions represented by the member churches.

Governance 
All member churches have representation in the Council's Governing Board, which meets semi-annually to identify needs and direct the affairs of the council. The Governing Board discerns, coordinates, and communicates the common mission of the churches, long-range planning, and policy formation. It has oversight over all the bodies and activities of the council, as well as the relationship between or among commissions, reference groups, working groups, committees, and Project Ploughshares, the peace research institute of the council.

Between meetings of the Governing Board, the Executive Committee of the Council oversees the life of the Council offices between meetings of the Governing Board and helps ensure its decisions and policies are implemented.

Structure 
The ecumenical work of the council is carried out across its various bodies:

 The Commission on Justice and Peace (CJP) 
 The Sexual Exploitation Working Group (SEWG)   
 The Commission on Faith and Witness (CFW)
 The Week of Prayer for Christian Unity (WPCU)
 Faith and Life Sciences Reference Group (FLSRG)
 Christian Interfaith Reference Group (CIRG) 
 Forum for Intercultural Leadership and Learning (FILL)
 Canadian Ecumenical Anti-Racism Network (CEARN)
 Project Ploughshares

Although each body the council has a distinctive focus and lens, they aim to bring their unique voices to bear on priorities of shared concern (also known as Operating Guidelines) that are collectively identified at the start of each triennium. The Operating Guidelines for the 2021-24 Triennium are:

 Joining and Inviting Young Adult Engagement
 Practising Faith Sharing
 Meeting Local Networks
 Striving Toward Just Intercultural Community
 Telling Our Stories

Past Work and Contributions of the Council

Through the ecumenical movement, which arose in Canada in the twentieth century, The Canadian Council of Churches seeks unity for the divided church and seeks to remind Christians that they share Christ's mission for reconciliation, peace, dignity, and justice for the whole community.

Some of the work done by the Council and the Member Churches working together includes:

Bringing member churches into encounter with one another in a forum where all voices hold equal weight. We promote understanding among them and with other Christian churches.
The founding and sponsorship of Project Ploughshares, a leading Canadian peace organization.
Providing a safe place for immigrant churches to learn about Canada and to put down roots.
Undertaking and promoting theological study and reflection among Christian traditions.
Encouraging and hosting churches' participation in dialogue with people of other faiths.
Studying, speaking about and acting on conditions that involve moral and spiritual principles, including current events such as the war on terror and societal issues such as the future of health care.
Sharing information broadly, communicating results of theological and ethical reflections to Canadian Society and governments.
Producing resources, including material for the Week of Prayer for Christian Unity.
Producing a bi-annual newsletter, Emmaus, and a periodic electronic newsletter entitled "Together"
Providing material to chaplains in Canada's armed forces and prisons, helping them work with stress-related trauma, mixed marriages and questions about life and death.

International participation

The Canadian Council of Churches is registered with the United Nations and participates in world conferences and commissions on such issues as funding for development, refugee settlement and human rights. The council is also a participant in the annual World Religious Leaders Summit, in parallel with the G8/G20 political summits each year. In 2010, the council also provided leadership for this event, when the international summit was hosted by Canada in Winnipeg, Manitoba.

See also
Canadian Council of Churches v. Canada (Minister of Employment and Immigration)
National Council of Churches (USA)
World Council of Churches

References

External links
Canadian Council of Churches

Christian organizations based in Canada
Canada
Christian organizations established in 1944
1944 establishments in Canada